is a female Japanese judoka. She won the gold medal in the half-lightweight (52 kg) division at the 2010 World Judo Championships.

External links
 

1985 births
Living people
Japanese female judoka
20th-century Japanese women
21st-century Japanese women